The Old Isle of Wight Courthouse was built in 1750-51 and was used as the main courthouse for Isle of Wight County, Virginia until a new courthouse was built at Isle of Wight, Virginia in 1800.   It is located in the Historic District in the town of Smithfield.

History
During its 50 years of use as the county courthouse, it was considered the center of life in Isle of Wight and in the town of Smithfield, which was incorporated in 1752.  It was constructed by William Rand, and featured a distinctive semi-circular apse and conical roof found in many English churches of the period and echoing the Colonial Capitol in Williamsburg. An adjacent clerk's office was constructed in 1799, although it was only in use for its intended purpose for a year, before the new courthouse at Isle of Wight was constructed.  
The old Smithfield courthouse was later modified into a family residence.  To do so, the arcade was blocked and the roof converted to a gable.

Preservation
The courthouse and clerk's office were acquired by Preservation Virginia in 1938 and an extensive restoration project was completed in 1959.

A second restoration of the courthouse was undertaken in the late 1990s with the help of Colonial Williamsburg consultants and craftsmen, in which the interior was modified to more accurately recreate the appearance of a typical Virginia courthouse of the period.

The building is one of four remaining examples of arcaded colonial courthouses.

In 2013, ownership passed from Preservation Virginia to the non-profit Historic Smithfield.  A semi-independent committee within Historic Smithfield known as 1750 Isle of Wight Courthouse raises money for the continued maintenance and restoration of the building and makes it available to the public, free of charge, year-round.

References

External links

 Visitor Information -  Isle of Wight-Smithfield-Windsor Chamber of Commerce
 Isle of Wight County Courthouse, Main & Mason Streets, Smithfield, Isle of Wight County, VA at the Historic American Buildings Survey (HABS) (pre-restoration)
 Small Brick Office, Mason & Main Streets, Smithfield, Isle of Wight County, VA at HABS

Courthouses on the National Register of Historic Places in Virginia
Government buildings completed in 1750
County courthouses in Virginia
Buildings and structures in Isle of Wight County, Virginia
National Register of Historic Places in Isle of Wight County, Virginia
Historic American Buildings Survey in Virginia
Individually listed contributing properties to historic districts on the National Register in Virginia
Museums in Isle of Wight County, Virginia